John Francis "Snowy" Blencowe (17 May 1891 – 19 August 1951) was an Australian rules footballer who played with Essendon and Geelong in the Victorian Football League (VFL).

Family
The son of Alfred George Blencowe (1867-1938), and Anastasia Blencowe (-1952), née Breen, Walter John Blencowe (later known as John Francis Blencowe) was born at Birchip, Victoria on 17 May 1891.

Football

Essendon (VFL)
He played one match for the Essendon First XVIII, against Fitzroy, in the last game of the 1912 season, on 31 August 1912.

Geelong (VFL)
In 1914, while playing with the Donald Football Club in the Donald District Football Association (DDFA), Blencowe obtained employment as a hairdresser and moved to Geelong.

He played two matches for the Geelong First XVIII: against Essendon, on 20 June 1914, and against Melbourne, on 4 July 1914.

Port Melbourne VFA)
Cleared from Geelong, he played six games for the Port Melbourne First XVIII in 1919.

Notes

References
 
 Maplestone, M., Flying Higher: History of the Essendon Football Club 1872–1996, Essendon Football Club, (Melbourne), 1996.

External links 
 
 
 Jack Blencowe, at The VFA Project.

1891 births
1951 deaths
Australian rules footballers from Victoria (Australia)
Essendon Football Club players
Geelong Football Club players
Port Melbourne Football Club players